Adolf Bierbrauer (26 July 1915 – 2 September 2012) was a German conceptual artist, painter and sculptor. He is known for his "hypnosis paintings" and "somnambulistic paintings" as well as for his sculptures.

Life 

Adolf Bierbrauer grew up with two sisters, Marianne and Gisela, on Glücksburger street in Düsseldorf-Oberkassel. His father was the manager of the ironworks Association in Düsseldorf.

During his high school years Bierbrauer studied piano and performed in public as a piano soloist. His piano teacher recommended the philosophical work of Rudolf Steiner to him. In 1930 Bierbrauer produced his first still life and within a year began his first figurative drawings. He created portraits of people in his neighborhood. In 1934 he traveled to the Goetheanum in Dornach (Switzerland) to study the works of Rudolf Steiner. In 1935, he began his study of medicine at the University of Marburg. He continued his study of medicine at Freiburg, Jena and at the Medical Academy in Düsseldorf. From 1940 to 1942 he served in the military service in France.

In 1942 Bierbrauer was called back to Düsseldorf due to the lack of military available in Düsseldorf during World War II. He received his doctorate there in 1943 and in January 1945 he sent to the Eastern Front as a military doctor. He was captured in Wroclaw and transported to Transcaucasia (Mingitschaur) to work as a roadbuilder and concrete worker as a Russian prisoner of war.

During his imprisonment, on behalf of the prisoner-of-war camp management Bierbrauer painted documentary images of the geological investigations of the terminal moraines. The prisoners also worked on archaeological excavations of medean graves. He was forbidden from painting and was ordered to create portraits of the guards.

In 1949, he returned to Düsseldorf where he became a volunteer physician at the University Hospital in Hamburg. From 1951 to 1953 he worked as psychotherapist at the 2nd Medical Academy in Düsseldorf, specializing in hypnosis treatments. At this time he began the creation of his first hypnosis paintings. His public opposition against electroshock therapy and insulin shock treatments lead to his release from hospital in 1953/1954.

He applied to the Kunstakademie Düsseldorf but was rejected.

In 1954 he received the circular medical certificate to establish himself as a general medical practitioner. Bierbrauer now specialized on nervous disorders and psychosomatic disorders. He focused on therapies that utilized hypnosis.

After 1960, he began making somnambulistic paintings. A heart attack in 1965 forced Bierbrauer to end working as a doctor. In 1973, he declared himself to be a freelance artist and started teaching painting lessons to children at his home. These lessons later became the first Waldorf kindergarten in Düsseldorf. Bierbrauer also worked as a pianist in Waldorf schools. In 1974 he applied again to the Kunstakademie Düsseldorf and was accepted. He spent two years there. At the same time he attended lectures of philosophy at Heinz Rudolf at the Heinrich Heine University Düsseldorf.

Starting in 1990, Bierbrauer created art which he described as Müllkunst (trash art). 1998 Bierbrauer moved to the anthroposophically oriented Heinrich-Zschokke Senior house in Düsseldorf-Gerresheim, that he also initiated. In 2000, his works were presented to the general public during the presentation of his monography at the NRW Forum for the first time. Bazon Brock and Gabriele Lohberg, Director of the Europäische Kunstakademie Trier (European Academy of Fine Arts Trier) held the introduction speeches.(1)

Life in Anthroposophic Senior home became intolerable to him. Some of his art works were destroyed due to unannounced renovations at his senior home.(2) At age 91 he moved to a new senior him in the Kasierwerther Diakonie, Ratingen.

In 2012 Bierbrauer was involved in the exhibition "The Great," at the Museum Kunst Palast Düsseldorf where his hypnosis works were on display. He attended the exhibition.  In the autumn of the same year Bierbrauer died of heart failure.(3)

Work 

Bierbrauer's key works are his hypnosis pictures from the early 1950s, his somnambulistic works, and his sculptures.

The focus of his work is the human being. In his early work pure representations of people, such as portraits and nudes can be found. He approached his artwork with concepts drawn from his background as a physician and psychotherapist, applying concepts of the human psyche to his work.

Bierbrauer painted the hypnosis images after stories and pictures from his patients in trance. They were created after the end of World War II created until the early 1950s.  Bierbrauer's art involved his work as a psychotherapist- using what he saw during hypnosis and narration from his patients, who were overcoming the personal traumas left by war. He claimed that he painted his pictures for the patients, in order to connect with them. He believed his works helped the patients while the patients' assisted his development as an artist creating works centered on the human psyche. In his understanding the artist could be a healer. With these works he had been one of the pioneers of the conceptual art movement in the 1960s in Europe.

His hypnosis paintings were accompanied with Bazon Brock and a performance of Joseph Beuys washing feet. Bazon Brock wrote in his book "Der Barbar als Kulturheld" (The barbarian as a cultural hero): "The results of these images that emerged then, are ultimately that important because they are artistic formally on the absolute highest level of its time. There is nothing comparable in the '50s."(5)

For Bierbrauer, since the late 1960s somnambulistic work had many parallels to works by informal artists like Emilio Vedova and Emil Schumacher. Their techniques are comparable also to the works of the abstract expressionism by Jackson Pollock or Jean-Michel Basquiat. Bierbrauer, trained by the hypnosis of his patients, began in this period to abstract from the patient's images and now betook himself into a somnambulistic, in a daydream-like state. He made paintings based on the "incorporation" of others and the search for his own identity.

Bierbrauer also produced sculptures. In his bronze figures such as the elephantine tantrum from 2001 he used an expressive free, unbound to the concrete form design, which received its informal expression which is increased by the titles-finding. They appear as trash-like sculptures, mostly composed of found material (see also Arte povera), connected with glue, metal wires and tinfoil.

Gallery Samples Hypnosis paintings

Art market 
Adolf Bierbrauer did no publicly show case his work until age 85, because he deemed his work a private matter. He did not receive public attention until the release of his monograph, when he gained public exposure. (4)

Exhibitions 
 2022 VOM TRAUM ZUM BILD (From Dream to Picture) with the somnambulistic works from Adolf Bierbrauer, Martin Leyer-Pritzkow, Düsseldorf
 2022 OUR FRIENDS with works from Adolf Bierbrauer, Stefan Demary, Jårg Geismar and Hans-Jörg Holubitschka; Martin Leyer-Pritzkow, Düsseldorf 
 2020 Thomas Bernstein - Adolf Bierbrauer Skulpturen (sculptures), Martin Leyer-Pritzkow, Düsseldorf
 2020 Pioneer of Social Sculpture - Part I, Adolf Bierbrauer's Hypnosispaintings, Martin Leyer-Pritzkow, Düsseldorf
 2019 ZWISCHEN WELTEN / BETWEEN WORLDS, with Armin Baumgarten, Martin Leyer-Pritzkow, Düsseldorf
 2015 Der Andere in mir – Adolf Bierbrauers Hypnosearbeiten (The other in me: Adolf Bierbrauer's hypnotic works), Onomato, Düsseldorf.
 2015 Natura nutrix- Homo vorax, Associazione Culturale Italo-Tedesca, Palazzo Albrizzi, collateral-event of the 56th Venice Biennale, Italy
 2014  Man kann es auch übertreiben (It can be overdone), Martin Leyer-Pritzkow, Düsseldorf
 2012 The Great, Museum Kunst Palast, Düsseldorf 
 2012 Auf der Suche nach dem verlorenen Ich (In Search of the Lost Identity), Municipal Gallery Schwabach, Germany
 2008 Tribute to Adolf Bierbrauer, Martin Leyer-Pritzkow, Duesseldorf 
 2002 The Archaic in art, Bierbrauer's works on the example of works from the collection of Prof. Hentrich, Duesseldorf 
 2001 People pictures, group exhibition with works by Armin Baumgarten, Woytek Berowski, Adolf Bierbrauer and Fabrizio Gazzarri, Martin Leyer-Pritzkow, Duesseldorf 
 2000 NRW Forum, solo exhibition with presentation of the Bierbrauer monograph, Düsseldorf
 1998 A. Bierbrauer, Martin Leyer-Pritzkow, Düsseldorf

Literature 
 Heath Ines Willner, The end of my biography must lead into the future, Rheinische Post, 12 April 1994 
 Adolf Bierbrauer, Edited by Martin Leyer-Pritzkow with contributions by Helmut Reuter and Veronika Kolbe and Roswitha Mosl. Euregio Publisher., Nordhorn 1999,  (1)
 Bazon Brock, Collected Writings 1991–2002, Vol III, The Barbarian as a cultural hero, aesthetics of omission, IV strategies of aesthetics, visual science, 8, incorporation and representation, pp. 465 ff, DuMont Literatur und Kunst Verlag, Cologne 2002,  (5)
 Helga Master, With 85 years discovered West German newspaper, 29 January 2000 
 Rudolf Heinz, editors, pathognomonic Studies, VII, texts for a Philosophy Psychoanalysis Finals, S.113ff., IV How hypnosis images are to be interpreted, Vol 31, The Blue Owl Verlag, Essen 2002,  
 Rudolf Heinz, editors, pathognomonic Studies, VIII, importune philosophy recourse to psychoanalysis, p 47, approximations to Adolf Bierbrauer's "hypnosis images", Vol 32, The Blue Owl Verlag, Essen 2003,  
 Klaus Sebastian, messages from the subconscious, Rheinische Post, 29 January 2003 
 Ursula Posny, a question of dignity, Neue Rhein-Ruhr Zeitung, 7 October 2006 (2)
 Bertram Müller, Adolf Bierbrauer – Lord of the colors, Rheinische Post, 13 October 2008 
 Katja Knicker, The Artist as a healer, Adolf Bierbrauer's hypnosis pictures, master's thesis to obtain the degree of Master of Arts Faculty of Philosophy, Heinrich-Heine-University Duesseldorf, January 2010 (3)
 Sabine Schuchart, trance and dream worlds, German Medical Journal, Vol 107, Issue 27, 4 July 2010 
 Robert Schmitt, The Healing as an artist, Martin Leyer-Pritzkow provides Adolf Bierbrauer's life work in the town house gallery before, Schwabacher Tageblatt, 30 March 2012 
 Bertram Müller, artist Adolf Bierbrauer died, Rheinische Post, 1 December 2012 
 Christiane Fricke, Durable "Köttelkarnickel", Handelsblatt, Live app., 23 May 2013 (4)
 ZWISCHEN WELTEN / BETWEEN WORLDS, Martin Leyer-Pritzkow (Publ.) with works of Adolf Bierbrauer and Armin Baumgarten, with text German / English, Düsseldorf 2019, 
 The Pioneer of Social Sculpture I - Adolf Bierbrauer, edited by Martin Leyer-Pritzkow, text in English, Düsseldorf 2020,

External links 
 official website of the artist Adolf Bierbrauer at Martin Leyer-Pritzkow
 Literature about Adolf Bierbrauer in the German National Library
 Literature about Adolf Bierbrauer in the Bibliothèque Kadinsky, Centre Pompidou, France
 Bazon Brock: Incorporation and representation, Speech for the exhibition "Adolf Bierbrauer", January 19th, 2000, NRW-Forum Düsseldorf
 The Pioneer of Social Sculpture - Online-Booklet, 2020

1915 births
German contemporary artists
20th-century German painters
German male painters
Abstract expressionist artists
21st-century German painters
21st-century German male artists
German conceptual artists
Modern artists
Anthroposophists
Kunstakademie Düsseldorf alumni
Artists from Düsseldorf
2012 deaths
20th-century German sculptors
20th-century German male artists
German male sculptors